Convention may refer to:
 Convention (norm), a custom or tradition, a standard of presentation or conduct
 Treaty, an agreement in international law
 Convention (meeting), meeting of a (usually large) group of individuals and/or companies in a certain field who share a common interest
 Fan convention, a gathering of fans of a particular media property or genre
 Anime convention, centered on Japanese anime and manga
 Comic book convention centered on comic books
 Gaming convention, centered on role-playing games, collectible card games, miniatures wargames, board games, video games, and the like
 Political convention, a formal gathering of people for political purposes
 Trade fair
 Bridge convention, a term in the game of bridge
 Convention (Paris Métro), a station on line 12 of the Paris Métro in the 15th arrondissement
 "The Convention" (The Office episode)
 "Convention" (Malcolm in the Middle episode)

See also
 Conference
 National Convention (disambiguation)